Remote Radar Head Portreath or RRH Portreath is an air defence radar station operated by the Royal Air Force.

Its radar (housed in a fibre glass or golf ball protective dome) provides long-range coverage of the south western approaches to the United Kingdom.

Second World War

Previously known as RAF Portreath, the station was built during 1940, opened in March 1941 and had a varied career during the Second World War, initially as a RAF Fighter Command station, from October 1941 as a ferry stop-over for aircraft bound to/from North Africa and the Middle East, as a temporary stop-over for United States Army Air Forces and Royal Canadian Air Force units, and then as a RAF Coastal Command station. By the end of the war, it had run down and in May 1950 was handed back to the government by the RAF.

The following squadrons were here at some point:

Units:

Chemical weapons centre
The base reverted to its local name Nancekuke and became an outstation of Chemical Defence Establishment (CDE) Porton Down. Manufacture of the nerve agent Sarin in a pilot production facility commenced there in the early 1950s, producing about 20 tons of the nerve agent from 1954 until 1956.  Nancekuke became an important factory for stockpiling the UK's Chemical Defences during the Cold War. Periodically, small amounts of VX were also produced at Nancekuke. Production of VX agent was intended mainly for laboratory test purposes, but also to validate plant designs and optimise chemical processes for potential mass-production. However, full-scale mass-production of VX agent never took place. In the late 1950s, the chemical weapons production plant at Nancekuke was mothballed, but was maintained through the 1960s and 1970s in a state whereby production of chemical weapons could easily re-commence if required.

In 2000 it was reported that former workers at the Nancekuke base had died as a result of exposure to nerve gas, and the matter was raised in the Houses of Parliament. It was alleged by The Independent that toxic materials had been dumped in nearby mineshafts. Works to cleanse the site began in 2003.

Further uses
Many of the CDE buildings were demolished in 1979–1980. From 1978 to 1981, some buildings on the site were used by Pattern Recognition Munitions for small arms ammunition development. The company also constructed a 100-yard firing range for ammunition testing. The RAF re-opened parts of the site as a manned radar station in October 1980, a Control and Reporting Post (CRP) for UK Air Surveillance. In 1986 an underground CRP was built as part of the new UKADGE (United Kingdom Air Defence and Ground Environment) project. New mobile radar systems manufactured by Marconi Electronic Systems, including an S723 Martello (RAF Type 91), and telecommunication installations were added during the mid-1980s. In the late 1990s, the installation became remote operation, and the primary radar was replaced with the British Aerospace (BAe) Type 101. The radar now in use at Portreath is a Type 102 Air Defence Radar.

As part of a major upgrade of RRH sites around the U.K. the MOD began a programme titled HYDRA in 2020 to install new state of the art communications buildings, radar towers and bespoke perimeter security.

The surrounding area is occasionally used for rallying. Although data is sent and used by the UK's Control and Reporting centres, Portreath's parent station was RAF St. Mawgan for administration.

See also

 Chemical weapons and the United Kingdom
 Improved United Kingdom Air Defence Ground Environment – UK air defence radar system in the UK between the 1990s and 2000s
 Linesman/Mediator – UK air defence radar system in the UK between the 1960s and 1984
 List of Royal Air Force stations
 NATO Integrated Air Defense System

References

Citations

Bibliography

 Smith, G (2000). Devon and Cornwall airfields in the Second World War. Countryside Books, 288pp, .

External links

 Subterranea Britannica – Portreath Reporting Post

Military history of Cornwall
Military of the United Kingdom in Cornwall
Radar stations
Royal Air Force stations in Cornwall
Radar equipment of the Cold War
1940 establishments in England